Wu Chun (born Goh Kiat Chun, Joseph Wu on 10 October 1979) is a Bruneian actor, singer, and model. He was a member of Fahrenheit, a Taiwanese Mandopop vocal quartet boy band, from its debut in 2005 to June 2011, singing bass. Wu has appeared in several Taiwanese television series, such as Tokyo Juliet (2006), Hanazakarino Kimitachihe (2006), Romantic Princess (2007), Hot Shot (2008), Sunshine Angel (2011), and Kindaichi Case Files (2012–2013). His film appearances include The Butterfly Lovers (2008), Lady of the Dynasty (2014). Wu Chun is one of the most followed celebrity on Sina Weibo and currently has more than 11 million followers. 

In 2014, he appeared in the reality television program, Dad is Back with his daughter, Nei Nei. In 2018, he was cast in the Chinese drama, Martial Universe. In 2018, Wu Chun appeared with his father, Wu Jingtian, in a reality tv show called Best Time. In early 2020, a reality TV show called Before Wedding with his wife in his home country Brunei and was a great success and well received all over China hitting 1.5 billion viewers. He was also honored in Madame Tussauds, a prestigious wax figure exhibit launch in Shanghai China after being on an almost year hiatus in showbiz. From 2019 to present, he is one the brand ambassadors of the luxury fashion house  Hugo Boss Asia that is headquartered in Metzingen, Baden-Württemberg, Germany. 

In 2020, he took part in a marine life protection campaign and was appointed as an ocean protection ambassador of Merlin Entertainments Group China, specifically advocating for the preservation of Beluga whales. He became the Pangolins Protection Ambassador for The World Wildlife Fund. In 2022, he did a commercial advertisement campaigns for multinational luxury fashion house Dior and cosmetics brand La Mer which is owned by american based The Estée Lauder Companies. In 2023, he became the representative of IQIYI, a china bases online video platform for the 2023 Australian Open.  

In Brunei, he was appointed as the Goodwill Ambassador and Messenger of Cancer Awareness; Wu's mother had died from cancer. 

In February 2023, Wu Chun has been appointed by the Union for International Cancer Control as the World Cancer Day ambassador.

Early life and education 
Wu Chun was born into a wealthy family of Chinese descent with ancestry from Lieyu, Kinmen, Fujian. Wu's father, Goh Kim Tian, is a real estate investor, and his family also owns a car agency and maintains close ties to the royal family. He studied in Chung Hwa Middle School in Bandar Seri Begawan, Brunei.  He attended the Foundation Studies program at Trinity College (University of Melbourne), Australia, in 1997, before continuing his studies at RMIT University in Melbourne, from which he graduated with a bachelor's degree in Business Administration with Distinction. He played for Brunei's National Basketball Team. Prior to joining Fahrenheit, Chun worked as a model for Yilin in Taiwan and Diva Models in Singapore. He is the managing director of Fitness Zone, a family-owned health club in Brunei. His venture for his business dreams made it to USA, China and other nearby Asian countries.

Career
As a model, Wu has appeared in magazines' cover page, such as Esquire, Elle for Men, Men's Health Magazine, Harper's BAZAAR Magazine, GQ, and Reader's Digest. He is a business owner in the Brunei fitness and health industry. His businesses include Bake Culture (Taiwan based artisan bakery), The Energy Kitchen (Brunei's First Healthy Restaurant, operated from 2014 - 2018), Fitness Zone (largest and biggest health club in Brunei since 2003), and WoMen Hair Salon (team of professionals for international celebrities). In China, he is the director of TV commercial advertisements for InterContinental Hotel. Wu has a number of commercial and charitable endorsements.

Wu has received an Asia Pacific Entrepreneurship Awards (APEA) Young Entrepreneur of The Year (2008), CQE Geneva QC Total Quality Management Model Award (2012), APEA Corporate Social Responsibility Award (2013). In 2015, Hassanal Bolkiah, the King of Brunei, presented to Wu an Excellent Youth Award.

Wu was chosen to be an ambassador for Brunei Anti Narcotic Drug Association in 2012. In 2014 he became the international brand ambassador of Royal Brunei Airlines and as a Taiwan tourism ambassador. On 24 June 2016, Wu became an ambassador of goodwill for a charity concert dedicated for children and athletes with special needs.

In 2018, he became the Goodwill Ambassador for Dementia Brunei, biggest advocate unit for Dementia early on set detection and prevention through healthy lifestyle. He initiated for Fitness Zone be an advocate as well to conduct monthly talks for the public. This was also the year that he became the Ambassador of Disney China and Legoland, and he noted that this has been one of the most memorable accomplishments for him as growing he is a big fan of Disney and his remarkable works. 2018 is a high time for endorsements for Wu as he endorses Lab Series, Land Rover, Head and Shoulders, Safeguard and Nutrilon.

2019, He won the Shanghai Television Festival as Best Breakthrough Artist for his first villain role in Martial Universe. STVF has become one of the most influential and prestigious international television festivals. In the same year of 2019, the International star is Hugo Boss' Asian Brand Ambassador for Spring/Summer 2019 Eyewear campaign.

Personal life
Wu Chun and his family live in Brunei. Wu is the nephew of the Legislative Council of Brunei's MP Goh King Chin. In March 2019, it was revealed that Wu has been married to his wife, Lin Liying, since 2004, instead of 2009 when he disclosed the fact in 2013. Wu and Lin have two children; a daughter, Neinei, born on 10 October 2010, and a son, Max, 11 October 2013. They held a long delayed wedding ceremony as part of a Chinese variety show, Before Wedding, which first telecast in March 2020 on Mango TV.

Philanthropy
In Brunei, Wu supports blood donation campaigns twice a year, environmental campaigns, and the disadvantaged. In May 2015 and 2016, he organized an inaugural and second female run in Brunei, "She Runs". All proceeds were donated to Yayasan Kanser Kanak Kanak (YASKA) or the Children's Cancer Foundation. Wu made a 10-hour road trip from Qinghai to small villages in China to bestow and pledge medical supplies and sports equipment. which raised $68,000 for its beneficiaries, Special Olympics Brunei Darussalam.

In September 2016, was the goodwill ambassador of the Roots and Wings Charity Concert in Brunei. The concert raised about 43,000 BND for the Special Olympics Brunei Darussalam and La vida Bhd.

Discography

As a member of Fahrenheit, Wu Chun released four studio Mandarin albums and three Japanese singles.

Filmography

Films

Television

Variety show

Awards and nominations

References

External links

  Wu Chun's Weibo microblog
  Wu Chun's Instagram account
 
 

1979 births
Living people
Bruneian expatriates in Australia
People from Bandar Seri Begawan
Bruneian male singers
Bruneian male actors
Bruneian people of Chinese descent
People educated at Trinity College (University of Melbourne)
RMIT University alumni
Taiwanese idols